Mahant Avaidyanath (born Kripal Singh Bisht, 28 May 1921 – 12 September 2014) was an Indian politician and Hindu preacher. He was the Mahant (chief priest) of Gorakhnath Temple, succeeding his guru Digvijay Nath. He was also a politician of the Hindu Mahasabha and, later Bharatiya Janata Party, being elected to the Lok Sabha from Gorakhpur four times. He played an important role in the Ram Janmabhoomi movement. He was the mentor and guru of Uttar Pradesh  Chief Minister Yogi Adityanath.

Career

Religious
Avaidyanath succeeded Mahant Digvijay Nath as the head of Gorakhnath Math. Upon his death in 2014, he was succeeded by Yogi Adityanath (Ajay Mohan Bisht).

Political
Avaidyanath was elected MLA from Maniram Assembly segment five times  – 1962, 1967, 1969 (resigned mid-term), 1974 and 1977, variously as Independent or Hindu Mahasabha's or Janata Party's candidate. He was elected Lok Sabha member from Gorakhpur as an Independent candidate in 1970 but lost 1971 General Election when Indira wave swept India. He won again in 1989 as candidate of Hindu Mahasabha. He was elected MP from the same seat in 1991 and 1996 as Bharatiya Janata Party nominee. He retired from electoral politics after that, and his protege Yogi Adityanath was elected to Lok Sabha in 1998 General Election.

Religio-political 
Mahant Avaidyanath was a leader of the Ram Janmabhoomi movement, founding the Sri Ramjanmabhoomi Mukti Yagna Samiti (Committee of sacrifice to liberate Ram's birthplace) in 1984. In September of that year, the Samiti launched a "religious procession with Hindu nationalist slogans" from Sitamarhi in Bihar to Ayodhya, with the mission of 'liberating' the Ram temple. Avaidyanath gave sermons exhorting the listeners to give votes only to those parties that promised to liberate the Hindu sacred places.

Death 
He died on 12 September 2014 in Gorakhpur. Prime Minister of India, Narendra Modi said he was "Saddened over the demise of Mahant Avaidyanath ji. He will be remembered for his patriotic zeal and determined efforts to serve society."

Home Minister Rajnath Singh and UP BJP president Laxmikant Bajpai also sent condolences on his death.

Commemoration 
A stamp is being released to mark the first death anniversary of Avaidyanath, who was also spiritual father of the current UP Chief Minister Yogi Adityanath. He died on 12 September 2014 at the age of 93.

References

Bharatiya Janata Party politicians from Uttar Pradesh
People from Gorakhpur
India MPs 1967–1970
India MPs 1989–1991
Lok Sabha members from Uttar Pradesh
India MPs 1991–1996
India MPs 1996–1997
Uttar Pradesh MLAs 1962–1967
Indian Hindu missionaries
1921 births
2014 deaths
Hindu Mahasabha politicians